is a Japanese football club from Kōfu in Yamanashi Prefecture. The team currently competes in the J2 League, Japanese second tier of professional football, hosting their home matches in the JIT Recycle Ink Stadium, located in Kōfu.

Name origin
The word "Ventforet" is a compound formed from two French root words: "vent" (wind) and "forêt" (forest). The name alludes to the famous phrase Fū-rin-ka-zan (風林火山）that Takeda Shingen, a prominent Kōfu-based daimyō in the Sengoku period, emblazoned on his war banners. The phrase contains four similies: as swift as the wind; as silent as a forest; as fierce as fire; as immovable as a mountain.

History

Kofu Club (1965–1994)

The club was founded in 1965 when the old boys' club of Kofu Dai-ichi High School, the Kakujo Club, started to recruit graduates of other high schools with the intention of promotion to the Japan Soccer League.

The club joined the newly formed JSL Division 2 in 1972. They stayed there until the conclusion of the league in 1992 when it became a founding member of the former Japan Football League.

Kofu Club was formed by volunteers, unlike other mainstream football clubs at that time in Japan, whose players were mostly the employees of their sponsoring companies.

Ventforet Kofu (1995–present)

The club was renamed Ventforet Kofu in 1995 and joined J.League Division 2 in 1999 when it was formed. The club survived a difficult period between 1999 and 2001, when it suffered from financial troubles as well as miserable results on the pitch, including a streak of twenty-five consecutive losses. Ventforet finished bottom for three seasons in succession and was dubbed as "Excess baggage of J2".

Ventforet improved in 2002, and in 2005 finished third, gaining promotion to the Japanese first division by winning the promotion/relegation play-offs against Kashiwa Reysol. However, the team was relegated with a week remaining in the 2007 season.

At the end of 2010 season, the team was promoted a second time. Despite having striker Mike Havenaar contend for the Top Scorer award in division one the following year, the club was relegated again at the end of 2011. However, it returned after only one year's absence as champions of division two, Ventforet's first championship in its thirty-six-year history.  Ventforet remained in J.League 1 until 2017, consistently staying as a top tier J.League 2 team after relegation

Emperor's Cup win (2022) 

Kofu participated in the 2022 Emperor's Cup, earning a direct second round entry alongside all J1 and J2 League teams. Following a 5-1 win over Okayama-based International Pacific University, they then only faced J1 League opponents the rest of the tournament. They would beat Hokkaido Consadole Sapporo and Sagan Tosu away from home by 2-1 and 3-1 respectively to advance to the quarter finals, in a stage which they had been on 4 times without ever getting past it. In another match away from home, now against Avispa Fukuoka, the game would be tied up 1-1 and head into extra time, with Yoshiki Torikai scoring in the 97th minute to bring Kofu to their first Emperor's Cup Semi-final, where they would beat Kashima Antlers thanks to Jumma Miyazaki's goal in the 37th minute to reach their first Emperor's Cup Final.

In the final, Kofu were up against Sanfrecce Hiroshima, a J1 team who hadn't won an Emperor's Cup since 1969 (including amateur era). Kazushi Mitsuhira scored in the 26th minute to give Kofu the lead, before Sanfrecce midfielder Takumu Kawamura tied the match in the 84th minute. After a scoreless extra time, the final was decided in a penalty shootout. After Sanfrecce missed their fourth penalty, 42-year-old Hideomi Yamamoto scored Kofu's fifth and final penalty to win the Emperor's Cup champions for the first time. Their win marked the first time that a J2 League team had won the Emperor's Cup since FC Tokyo in 2011, the fourth J2 champion overall, and the first occasion in which the winner was not the second division champions. Thus, they will play the AFC Champions League while playing in their domestic second-tier league.

League history
Kanto League: 1967–71 (as Kofu Club)
Division 2 (JSL Div. 2): 1972–91 (as Kofu Club)
Division 3 (former JFL Div. 2): 1992–93 (as Kofu Club)
Division 2 (former JFL): 1994–98 (Kofu Club until 1994, Ventforet Kofu since 1995)
Division 2 (J.League Div. 2): 1999–05
Division 1 (J.League Div. 1): 2006–07
Division 2 (J.League Div. 2): 2008–10
Division 1 (J.League Div. 1): 2011
Division 2 (J.League Div. 2): 2012
Division 1 (J.League Div. 1): 2013–2017
Division 2 (J.League Div. 2): 2018–

League and cup record 

Key

Honours

League
J.League Division 2: 2012
Kantō Soccer League: 1969, 1970

Cups
Emperor's Cup: 2022
All Japan Senior Football Championship: 1969

Current squad
As of 20 February 2023.

Club officials
For the 2023 season.

Managerial history

Kit evolution

References

External links
 Official website

Ventforet Kofu
J.League clubs
Japan Soccer League clubs
Football clubs in Japan
Association football clubs established in 1965
Sports teams in Yamanashi Prefecture
1965 establishments in Japan
Japan Football League (1992–1998) clubs
Emperor's Cup winners